Tarık Çetin (born 8 January 1997) is a Turkish professional footballer who plays as a goalkeeper for Çaykur Rizespor.

Club career
On 24 July 2019, Çetin signed a professional contract with Çaykur Rizespor. He made his professional debut with Çaykur Rizespor in a 2–0 Süper Lig loss to Galatasaray on 1 November 2019.

References

External links
 TFF Profile
 

1997 births
Living people
People from Kadıköy
Footballers from Istanbul
Turkish footballers
Association football goalkeepers
Turkey youth international footballers
Süper Lig players
TFF Second League players
Fenerbahçe S.K. footballers
Fatih Karagümrük S.K. footballers
Çaykur Rizespor footballers